Kevin Strong Jr. (born August 5, 1996) is an American football defensive end for the Arizona Cardinals of the National Football League (NFL). He played college football at UTSA before graduating in 2018. He signed as an undrafted free agent with the Detroit Lions in 2019.

College career
Strong was a member of the UTSA Roadrunners for five seasons, redshirting his freshman year. As a junior, Strong was named second-team All-Conference USA after recording 27 tackles, seven tackles for loss and three sacks. He finished his collegiate career with 106 tackles (26.5 for loss), 7.5 sacks, three pass deflections, two forced fumbles, a fumble recovery and two blocked kicks in 47 games played (40 starts).

Professional career

Detroit Lions
Strong signed with the Detroit Lions as an undrafted free agent on May 10, 2019. He made his NFL Debut on September 8, 2019, against the Arizona Cardinals. On November 12, 2019, Strong was placed on injured reserve after an season ending injury. He finished his rookie season with five tackles and a pass defended in eight games played.

On September 5, 2020, Strong was waived by the Lions and signed to the practice squad the next day. He was elevated to the active roster on September 19 for the team's week 2 game against the Green Bay Packers, and reverted to the practice squad after the game. He was released by the Lions on November 11, 2020. He re-signed to the practice squad on December 1, 2020, and was promoted to the active roster the next day. In Week 17 against the Minnesota Vikings, Strong recorded his first career sack on Kirk Cousins during the 37–35 loss.

On September 25, 2021, Strong was placed on injured reserve. He was activated on November 2, 2021. He was waived on November 20.

Tennessee Titans
Strong signed with the Tennessee Titans' practice squad on November 23, 2021. He was promoted to the active roster on January 8, 2022.

Arizona Cardinals
On March 15, 2023, Strong signed a one-year contract with the Arizona Cardinals.

References

External links
Tennessee Titans bio
UTSA Roadrunners bio

1996 births
Living people
American football defensive ends
American football defensive tackles
Arizona Cardinals players
Detroit Lions players
People from Cleveland, Texas
Players of American football from Texas
Sportspeople from the Houston metropolitan area
Tennessee Titans players
UTSA Roadrunners football players